Bleekeria is a genus of sand lances native to the Indian Ocean and the western Pacific Ocean.

Species
There are currently 6 recognized species in this genus:
 Bleekeria estuaria J. E. Randall & H. Ida, 2014 
 Bleekeria kallolepis Günther, 1862
 Bleekeria mitsukurii D. S. Jordan & Evermann, 1902
 Bleekeria murtii K. K. Joshi, Zacharia & P. Kanthan, 2012 
 Bleekeria profunda J. E. Randall & H. Ida, 2014 
 Bleekeria viridianguilla Fowler, 1931

References

Ammodytidae
Marine fish genera
Taxa named by Albert Günther